Riese & Müller is a bicycle manufacturer in Darmstadt, Germany founded by Markus Riese and Heiko Müller. It designs and makes suspended bicycles. Frames are produced by companies such as Pacific Cycles, Taiwan. All of their bikes are assembled by hand in Germany.

Riese & Müller was founded in 1993 to sell Hot Ears, earmuffs to keep the ears warm while wearing a helmet. The first bicycle, the folding bicycle known as the Birdy, started in the garage of Heiko Müller's parents as a university project.  Riese & Müller had a revenue of €76 million a year. In 2006 it started selling Zwei bike bags.
Other models produced by Riese & Müller are:
Charger3
Mountain Climber
Packster 70
Multicharger Mixte
Roadster
Nevo3
Cruiser Mixte
Birdy (a folding bike with 18" wheels)
Frog bicycle (a folder with 12" wheels, discontinued for years but available with 16" wheels as of 2010)
Avenue
Culture
Equinox (discontinued)
Gemini (discontinued)
Homage (since November 2005)
Intercontinenta
e-bikes Delite, Charger, Nevo, Swing, & Tinker

See also 

 List of electric bicycle brands and manufacturers
 Outline of cycling

References

External links 

 
History of Riese & Müller and the Birdy 

Companies based in Hesse
Cycle manufacturers of Germany
Folding bicycles
Cycle designers
German brands
Cycle types
Bicycle
Electric bicycles
History of cycling
Micromobility
Electric
Road cycles